Wila Wila (Aymara wila blood, blood-red, the reduplication indicates that there is a group or a complex of something, "a complex of red color", Hispanicized spelling Vilavila) is a mountain in the Andes of Peru, about  high. It is situated in the Puno Region, Puno Province, on the border of the districts Mañazo and Tiquillaca. Wila Wila lies between the lake Mayasani in the west and the river Wanuni (Huanune) in the east.

References

Mountains of Peru
Mountains of Puno Region